KPBT-TV (channel 36) branded on-air as Basin PBS, is a PBS member television station licensed to Odessa, Texas, United States, serving the Permian Basin area. Owned by Permian Basin Public Telecommunications, Inc., the station maintains studios at the Historic Ritz Theatre in downtown Midland, and a transmitter near Gardendale.

History
The station signed on March 24, 1986 as KOCV-TV. Between 1970 and 1986, PBS programming had to be sold to the Odessa–Midland market's commercial stations on a per program basis (although the full PBS schedule was viewable in the northwestern portion of the market via Portales, New Mexico-based KENW).

The station was formerly owned by Odessa College (callsign meaning: "Odessa College Voice") and later by the Ector County Independent School District. Former First Lady Laura Bush was one of the station's 500 original members. The station changed its calls to KPBT-TV in 2006, following transfer to community ownership.

Technical information

Subchannels
The station's digital signal is multiplexed:

Analog-to-digital conversion
KPBT-TV shut down its analog signal, over UHF channel 36, on February 17, 2009, the original target date in which full-power television in the United States were to transition from analog to digital broadcasts under federal mandate (which was later pushed back to June 12, 2009). The station's digital signal remained on its pre-transition UHF channel 38. Through the use of PSIP, digital television receivers display the station's virtual channel as its former UHF analog channel 36.

References

External links

Television channels and stations established in 1986
1986 establishments in Texas
PBT-TV